Gessert is a surname of German origin. Notable people with the surname include:

Armin Gessert (1963–2009), German computer game developer
George Gessert, American artist

References

Surnames of German origin